Silver Township may refer to the following townships in the United States:

 Silver Township, Cherokee County, Iowa
 Silver Township, Carlton County, Minnesota

See also
 Silver Creek Township (disambiguation)
 Silver Lake Township (disambiguation)